Burnt Mills is an census designated place in Montgomery County, Maryland, United States. Per the 2020 Census, the population was 3,592.

History
The site of a grist mill that burned down before 1788, Burnt Mills became an important source of clean drinking water for Montgomery and Prince George's Counties in 1929 when the Washington Suburban Sanitary Commission (WSSC) built a water filtration plant here along the Northwest Branch Anacostia River near Silver Spring, Maryland.  

At the time of its construction in 1929, the water filtration plant at Burnt Mills was considered a landmark achievement by Robert B. Morse, chief engineer, and the WSSC, reflecting public awareness "of the importance of managed water systems to public health." The plant's office and pumping station were housed inside two Georgian Revival style houses at 10700 and 10701 Colesville Road (also known as Columbia Pike). A steel and concrete hollow deck Ambersen style dam was built across the river.  

The Robert B. Morse Filtration Plant ceased operation in 1962 when it was replaced by water filtration plants on the Patuxent and Potomac Rivers. Its water filtration and pumping facilities were removed, but the two Georgian Revival buildings and the dam remain.  A historical marker identifies the location of the filtration plant and the site of the former Bealle's Mill at Burnt Mills.

Burnt Mills is home to a large population Orthodox and Conservative Jews. The Silver Spring Eruv Association includes parts of Burnt Mills / White Oak and the nearby neighborhoods of Kemp Mill and Colesville. Burnt Mills is home to an Orthodox synagogue, the Southeast Hebrew Congregation. Southeast Hebrew was originally founded by Orthodox Eastern European immigrants in 1909 on Capitol Hill in Washington, D.C. Many Jews began to move out of Southeast Washington beginning in the 1930s and Southeast Hebrew was relocated to White Oak in 1971.

Demographics

2020 census

Note: the US Census treats Hispanic/Latino as an ethnic category. This table excludes Latinos from the racial categories and assigns them to a separate category. Hispanics/Latinos can be of any race.

References

Ashkenazi Jewish culture in Maryland
Census-designated places in Montgomery County, Maryland
Census-designated places in Maryland
Conservative Judaism in Maryland
Jews and Judaism in Silver Spring, Maryland
Orthodox Jewish communities
Orthodox Judaism in Maryland